Rivista di Filologia e di Istruzione Classica or Riv. Fil. is a peer reviewed Italian academic journal, Published by Brepols. It presents articles and essays on Greek and Roman languages and literatures, history, philosophy, religion, art, and society.

References

External links 

 on archive.org (1873–1943)

Classics journals
Publications established in 1872
Quarterly journals
Brepols academic journals